Bill Morrisette (born October 18, 1931) is a retired educator and politician in the U.S. state of Oregon.  He was a member of the Oregon State Senate, representing Springfield (District 6) (2003-2010). He was previously a member of the Oregon House of Representatives (1999–2002); Mayor of Springfield, OR (1989–1999); and a Springfield City Council member (1987–1989). He taught social studies at Springfield High School from 1963 to 1990.

Morrisette has focused on education and human services while in the legislature. As a member of the Oregon House of Representatives, he served as vice-chair of the Education Committee, and served as a member of Human Resources and Business and Consumer Affairs committees. In the Senate, he chaired the Senate education committee during the 2003 session. He chaired the Senate Health and Human Services Committee during the 2005 session.

Morrisette was born in Anaconda, Montana, and is a Catholic. He was married to Janice Maureen McKenzie for 61 years, before she died in November 2013. Together, they had eight children, thirteen grandchildren, and six great grandchildren. Morrisette earned a bachelor's degree in economics and political science from Carroll College in 1953, and a master's degree in education from the University of Oregon in 1966.

See also
Seventy-fourth Oregon Legislative Assembly
Seventy-third Oregon Legislative Assembly

References

External links
Official Senate web page
Project Vote Smart page
Campaign contributions, 2000

Oregon state senators
Members of the Oregon House of Representatives
People from Springfield, Oregon
Mayors of places in Oregon
University of Oregon alumni
Oregon city council members
1931 births
Living people
Schoolteachers from Oregon
21st-century American politicians
People from Anaconda, Montana